Coherent Solutions is a software product development and consulting company with headquarters in Minneapolis, Minnesota, and offshore development offices in Costa Rica, Bulgaria, Moldova, Mexico, Poland, Lithuania, Ukraine, Romania, Belarus, Georgia, Portugal, and Poland. The company provides software development services and digital engineering with a focus on Microsoft, Java, and other technologies for Web, Mobile, and Integration solutions.

History
In 1995, Igor Epshteyn founded Coherent Solutions in Minneapolis, Minnesota, United States, North America.

In 2003, eight years later, Epshteyn established a development center in Minsk, Belarus, Europe. Coherent's Minneapolis office then became primarily responsible for sales, account management, and front-end consulting onsite with its customers. The company's Minsk office, on the other hand, has performed mainly software design, development, testing, and maintenance.

In 2006, Coherent Solutions became a Microsoft Gold Certified Partner.

In Minsk, Coherent Solutions operates under its subsidiary 'ISsoft Solutions'. In 2007, under the ISsoft name, the company became a member of Belarus High Technologies Park.

References

External links 
 Coherent Solutions website
 Issoft Solutions website

Software companies of Belarus
Companies based in Minneapolis
Software companies based in Minneapolis
Software companies based in Minnesota
Companies established in 1995
Privately held companies based in Minnesota
Software companies of the United States